Gaudensi Allar (February 17, 1841 – August 22, 1904) was a French architect.

Early life
Gaudensi Allar was born on February 17, 1841. His brother was sculptor André-Joseph Allar (1845-1926). In 1854, he served aboard a ship in the Crimean War.

Career
His first architectural work was the Ecole Rouvière, a primary school located at 83 Boulevard Redon in Marseille; his brother sculpted the facade.

In 1889, he was commissioned by Nicolas Chave, son of André Chave (1799-1868), to design a private residence on the corner of the Boulevard Chave and the Place Jean Jaurès in Marseille; his brother was asked to sculpt a bust of André Chave on the corner as well.

In 1893–1894, he restored the Église Dormition de la Mère de Dieu, a Greek Orthodox church located at 23 Rue de la Grande Armée in the 1st arrondissement of Marseille.

He also designed a building located at 15 rue Honnorat in Marseille, known as the Foyer social Honnorat or the Fondation Massabo-Zafiropulo.

Personal life
He died on August 22, 1904.

Legacy
His bust, sculpted by his brother, is displayed in the Art Museum of Toulon in Toulon.

Biography
Gaudensi Allar, Quelques elements d'hygiene appliques a l'habitation moderne (Samat & Company, 1903).

References

1841 births
1904 deaths
19th-century French architects
Architects from Marseille
French military personnel of the Crimean War